Posyolok sovkhoza Rossoshansky is a rural locality (a settlement) in Arkhipovskoye Rural Settlement, Rossoshansky District, Voronezh Oblast, Russia. The population was 571 as of 2010. There are 10 streets.

Geography 
The settlement is located 10 km west of Rossosh (the district's administrative centre) by road. Arkhipovka is the nearest rural locality.

References 

Rural localities in Rossoshansky District